The Seventh Menzies ministry (Liberal–Country Coalition) was the 37th ministry of the Government of Australia. It was led by the country's 12th Prime Minister, Robert Menzies. The Seventh Menzies ministry succeeded the Sixth Menzies ministry, which dissolved on 11 January 1956 following the federal election that took place in the previous December. It is the first ministry to consist of a two-tier ministry, with only senior ministers being members of Cabinet, while the other ministers are in the outer ministry. With the exception of the Whitlam government and the caretaker First Fraser ministry, this practice has endured to this day. The ministry was replaced by the Eighth Menzies ministry on 10 December 1958 following the 1958 federal election.

Allen Fairhall, who died in 2006, was the last surviving member of the Seventh Menzies Ministry; Fairhall was also the last surviving member of the Ninth Menzies ministry. Hugh Roberton was the last surviving Country junior minister, and Paul Hasluck and John McEwen were the last surviving Liberal and Country Cabinet ministers respectively.

Cabinet

Outer ministry

Notes

Ministries of Elizabeth II
Menzies, 07
1956 establishments in Australia
1958 disestablishments in Australia
Robert Menzies
Cabinets established in 1956
Cabinets disestablished in 1958